Morgan Lamoisson (born 7 September 1988 in Issoudun) is a French former cyclist, who rode professionally between 2013 and 2015 for the  team. Lamoisson retired at the end of the 2016 season, after a season with amateur team Vendée U.

Major results

2011
 1st Stage 3 Tour du Loir-et-Cher
 6th La Roue Tourangelle
2012
 4th Val d'Ille Classic
2014
 5th Châteauroux Classic
 7th Overall Tour de l'Eurométropole
2015
 6th Duo Normand (with Julien Morice)

References

External links

 
 
 

1988 births
Living people
French male cyclists
People from Issoudun
Sportspeople from Indre
Cyclists from Centre-Val de Loire